Beatles Day celebrates The Beatles' return to Liverpool on 10 July 1964 from their US tour, in time for the premiere of their film A Hard Day's Night. This day is considered one of the landmarks in their rise to fame, and, since 2008, its anniversary has been celebrated as Beatles Day in both Liverpool and Hamburg.

References

External links
Beatles Day on the British Beatles Fanclub Website

Monuments and memorials to the Beatles
July observances
Recurring events established in 2008